Blood orange is a variety of orange with crimson, blood-colored flesh.

Blood orange, blood oranges or red orange may also refer to:

Film
 Blood Orange (1953 film) or Three Stops to Murder
 Blood Orange (2016 film), starring Iggy Pop and Kacey Barnfield
 The Blood Oranges, a 1997 erotic drama film

Other uses
 Blood Orange (novel), a 2019 novel by Harriet Tyce
 The Blood Oranges (novel), a 1971 novel
 Dev Hynes, English singer and director known professionally as Blood Orange
 Blood Oranges, an alternative country band
 RAL 2001 Red orange, a RAL color
 RAL 2002 Blood orange, a RAL color

See also